Kumar Shahani (born 7 December 1940) is an Indian film director and screenwriter, best known for his parallel cinema films Maya Darpan (1972), Tarang (1984), Khayal Gatha (1989) and Kasba (1990). Due to his dedication to formalism, and with the reputation of his first feature—Maya Darpan being considered among Indian cinema's first formalist film—critics and film enthusiasts often associated him with filmmakers such as Pier Paolo Pasolini, Andrei Tarkovsky and Jacques Rivette. Known also as a teacher and theorist of cinema, whose essays The Shock of Desire and Other Essays, comprising 51 essays, was published by Tulika Books in 2015.

Early life
Shahani was born in Larkana, Sindh (now in Pakistan). After the partition of India in 1947, Shahani's family shifted to the city of Bombay (now Mumbai). He received a B. A. (hons) from the University of Bombay in Political Science and History and studied screenplay writing and Advanced Direction at the Film and Television Institute of India, where he was a student of Ritwik Ghatak. He also studied with Dharmananda Damodar Kosambi. He was awarded a French Government Scholarship for further studies in France, where he studied at the Institut des hautes études cinématographiques (IDHEC) and assisted Robert Bresson on Une Femme Douce.

Career
He returned to India to make his first feature film Maya Darpan in 1972 and had to wait twelve years before he received funding to make his next full-length feature film, Tarang.

From 1976 to 1978 he held a Homi Bhabha Fellowship to study the epic tradition of the Mahābhārata, Buddhist iconography, Indian classical music and the Bhakti movement.

Influences
Shahani had considered Roberto Rossellini and Robert Bresson as major influences on his work and those who he learned the most from. When comparing the two he stated, "There is austerity in Bresson. But there is a possibility in cinema to have both: austerity and ornamentation. In Bresson, there is mainly austerity even though he aspires to have spectacle. When I work along those lines, I want the ornamentation to stand out. The magic of that reality must appear and we ought to allow that to happen. The notion of ornamentation that we have in India, the alankar, of how we play with it, that is something I like to retain in my work. And this is not there either in Rossellini’s work or Bresson’s in the works of Catholic filmmakers. When they move towards austerity, they really move towards it: Bresson in the tradition of St Augustine and Rossellini more in the manner of notational narratives."

For his film Tarang which dealt with labour issues, Shahani mentioned he consciously tried to avoid 'repeating' or 'imitating' one of his favourite films Sergei Eisenstein's Battleship Potemkin. Shahani stated, "for Tarang for instance, I was shooting a strike sequence. It was an obvious point where one could have quoted Eisenstein. Most filmmakers in such a situation would do so, inadvertently and unconsciously. Even the most "bourgeois" filmmakers as it were, the most commercial ones, or their exact opposites, would all do that. That is why one should remember him, to remember what he did and not to repeat it. So I remembered him while I was shooting that sequence, constantly like a prayer. We can't help saying that Eisenstein did it such a way and let only him do like that. That is why I feel very happy with that particular sequence in Tarang. It doesn't have, in any sense, an imitation of Eisenstein."

Filmography

Awards

 National Award (1972, 1984, 1991)
Filmfare Critics Awards – Best Film (1972, 1990, 1991)
The International Film Festival of Rotterdam – FIPRESCI Award (1990)
Prince Claus Award (1998)

References

External links
 Kumar Shahani - The Shock of Desire and Other Essays ed. Ashish Rajadhyakhsha
 Laleen Jayamanne The Epic Cinema of Kumar Shahani 
 Jacques Kermabon & Kumar Shahani Cinema and Television: Fifty Years of Reflection in France 
 
 The museum as a refuge for film: the case for Kumar Shahini's epic cinema at Indian Auteur 

1940 births
Living people
Hindi-language film directors
People from Larkana District
Film directors from Mumbai
Sindhi people
University of Mumbai alumni
Film and Television Institute of India alumni
20th-century Indian film directors
Indian male screenwriters
Indian documentary filmmakers
Special Mention (feature film) National Film Award winners